Cyperus owanii is a species of sedge that is native to parts of south eastern Africa.

The species was first formally described by the botanist Johann Otto Boeckeler in 1878.

See also 
 List of Cyperus species

References 

owanii
Taxa named by Johann Otto Boeckeler
Plants described in 1878
Flora of Botswana
Flora of Mozambique
Flora of South Africa